Charles the Gorilla is a wild-born western lowland gorilla from Gabon, West Africa. Although the date of his birth is unknown his approximate date of birth is September 23, 1972; it is, however, celebrated on January 19 each year. At a time when humans were less vigilant about their treatment of threatened and endangered species, Charles was sought after by a group of poachers interested in acquiring gorillas for international trade. (At the time, gorilla infants could fetch a price of up to $5000.00.) He is thought to have been found lying next to the corpse of his dead mother.

Toronto Zoo

On September 24, 1974, Charles was sent to the Toronto Zoo, where he has lived ever since. His name was given to him because his particularly round face reminded the staff at the zoo of Charlie Brown. When Charles was first brought to the zoo, he was considered rather unattractive because he was missing part of his hair and had lesions and/or sores that bespeckled his body.

Charles, along with Amanda, Barney, Caroline, Josephine, Julia and Samantha, were part of the Toronto Zoo's first acquisition of a group of wild-caught gorillas for the newly opened zoo. The Toronto Zoo opened its doors in August 1974 and since then some 33 million visitors have seen the zoo's gorillas (a figure which grows by about a million people each year). This group of seven gorillas has conceived over 33 children and are represented by more than 23 living offspring, comprising three generations. As of 2018, Charles has sired sixteen children, of which ten still survive today. He also has six grandchildren.

Artwork

Charles is an accomplished painter. Although the group had always been exposed to the visual arts, Charles' niche for the medium sprung up as a result of behavioural enrichment during a turbulent time in the gorilla group's stay at the Toronto Zoo. During a period of time between 1990 and 1998, Charles (now a well-sized Silverback male) was not interested in interacting with offspring that were not his own. And so in an effort to allow the gorilla group to meet with some of the zoo's other gorilla progeny (i.e., Barney's children), Charles spent a brief period of each day in solitude. In an effort to keep Charles contented during these intervals away from his harem, Charles was given access to large sheets of paper and non-toxic coloured paints. In an effort to raise funds for a new gorilla exhibit at the Toronto Zoo, some of these works were exhibited and sold at a private art gallery and were sold for $400 to $800 each which raised over $37,000.00 for the Toronto Zoo.

Offspring

As in the wild, the fate of Charles' offspring would be that once they reached maturity they would have to find another family to live with. This is to prevent inbreeding with the females and suppress the violent tactics of maturing blackback males interested in challenging their fathers for control of the group. His daughter Sekani (born 1990) now lives in Arkansas at the Little Rock Zoo. His son Jomo (born on 1991 but passed away on 2022) resided at the Cincinnati Zoo. Both Jomo and Sekani are parents to two boys. His third adult son Subira resided at the Dallas Zoo. He also has five younger offspring, Johari (female, born May 12, 2001), Sadiki (male, born March 7, 2005), Nassir (male, born September 2, 2009), Nneka (female, born January 9, 2014), and Charlie (female, born June 7, 2018) living with him at the Toronto Zoo.

Another of Charles' offspring was sent to the Dallas Zoo where in March 2004, Jabari (born 1990) escaped his enclosure and injured 3 patrons. Jabari was supposedly thrown into a fit of rage by a group of youths that taunted him and, in an effort to exact his revenge, he climbed an 18-foot wall and ran amok in the visitors' viewing area while patrons fled in panic. After 45 minutes outside of his exhibit, the Dallas police were called in to control the situation. In what was reported as an attack on officers, Dallas police shot and killed Jabari before zoo staff could dart or subdue him.

See also
 List of individual apes

References 

Individual gorillas